Baynton is an English surname. Notable people with the surname include:

Andrew Baynton (fl. 1540), English scholar
Barbara Baynton (1857–1929), Australian writer
Henry Baynton (1892–1951), English actor
Henry Baynton (died 1616) ( – 1616), English politician
Henry Baynton I (fl. 1572–1593), English politician
Jack Baynton (1859–1939), English footballer
Martin Baynton (born 1953), English writer
Mary Baynton (fl. c.1533), impostor who pretended to be Henry VIII's daughter, the future Mary I of England
Mathew Baynton, English actor
Robert Baynton (1900–1924), English cricketer
Thomas Baynton (1761–1820), English medical writer and surgeon

See also 

 Bayntun, a variant spelling

English-language surnames